Abdelhafid Tasfaout (born 11 February 1969) is an Algerian former professional footballer who played as a midfielder. He was the captain of the Algerian national team for five years.

Career
Tasfaout suffered a life-threatening head injury during the 2002 African Cup of Nations in Mali after he clashed with Boubacar Diarra of Mali. An ambulance was driven onto the pitch to give assistance and at the time many of his teammates feared he had been killed. However, he made a complete recovery and it was confirmed that he suffered a broken nose and a swallowed tongue.

Tasfaout is the Algeria national team's all-time second best scorer just behind Islam Slimani. He played 80 matches and scored 36 goals.

Career statistics

Club

International

Scores and results list Algeria's goal tally first, score column indicates score after each Tasfaout goal.

Honours
MC Oran
Algerian Championship: 1991–92, 1992–93

Auxerre
French Division 1: 1995–96
Coupe de France: 1995–96

Guingamp
Coupe de France: runner-up 1996–97

Algeria
Afro-Asian Cup of Nations: 1991

Individual
Best Algerian player in 1992, 1993 and 1994
Best goalscorer of the Algerian Championship in 1992 and 1993 with 17 goals

References

External links

1969 births
Living people
Algerian footballers
Algeria international footballers
Association football midfielders
1992 African Cup of Nations players
1996 African Cup of Nations players
1998 African Cup of Nations players
2000 African Cup of Nations players
2002 African Cup of Nations players
Algerian expatriate footballers
AJ Auxerre players
Expatriate footballers in France
Algerian expatriate sportspeople in France
En Avant Guingamp players
Ligue 1 players
Footballers from Oran
MC Oran players
Al-Rayyan SC players
ASM Oran players
Expatriate footballers in Qatar
Algerian expatriate sportspeople in Qatar
Qatar Stars League players
21st-century Algerian people